Dmitry Sviridenko (born 20 August 1997) is a Belarusian professional footballer who plays for Lokomotiv Gomel.

References

External links
 
 
 Profile at Gomel website

1997 births
Living people
Belarusian footballers
Association football midfielders
FC Gomel players
FC Lokomotiv Gomel players